Corbin James Clouse (born June 26, 1995) is an American professional baseball pitcher who is currently a free agent.

Career
Clouse attended Grand Ledge High School in Grand Ledge, Michigan, and played college baseball at Davenport University in Grand Rapids, Michigan. In 2016, as a redshirt sophomore, he went 5–0 with a 1.62 ERA. After the season, he was drafted by the Atlanta Braves in the 27th round of the 2016 Major League Baseball draft.

Clouse made his professional debut that year with the Danville Braves, and after pitching  scoreless innings, was promoted to the Rome Braves where he finished the season, posting a 1.52 ERA over 15 relief appearances. He began 2017 with the Florida Fire Frogs and was promoted to the Mississippi Braves during the season. Over 41 relief appearances between both teams, he was 5–4 with a 2.53 ERA and a 1.55 WHIP. After the season, he played in the Arizona Fall League. He began 2018 with Mississippi and was promoted to the Gwinnett Stripers in August. Over 45 appearances (three starts) between the two clubs, he went 6–2 with a 1.94 ERA, striking out 83 batters in 65 innings. He returned to Gwinnett for the 2019 season, going 0–3 with a 5.65 ERA over  relief innings, striking out 37. Following the season's end, he underwent shoulder surgery.

Clouse did not play a minor league game in 2020 due to the cancellation of the minor league season caused by the COVID-19 pandemic. Due to undisclosed reasons, Clouse did not make his 2021 debut until mid-August, with Mississippi. Over 13 games (three starts), he went 1–0 with a 1.48 ERA and 33 strikeouts over  innings. He elected free agency after the 2022 season.

References

External links

1995 births
Living people
Baseball pitchers
Baseball players from Michigan
Davenport University alumni
Danville Braves players
Florida Complex League Braves players
Florida Fire Frogs players
Gulf Coast Braves players
Gwinnett Stripers players
Mississippi Braves players
Peoria Javelinas players
Rome Braves players
Sportspeople from Lansing, Michigan